Braxton Bragg "Opp" O'Mara (September 15, 1896 – May 24, 1969) was an American football player and coach of football and basketball. He served as a football player-coach for one season at the University of Southern Mississippi–then known as Mississippi Normal College–in 1920, compiling a record of 4–2–1. His stint as a player at Hattiesburg was sandwiched between two stints as a player at the University of Mississippi (1918–1919, 1921). O'Mara graduated from the University of Mississippi School of Medicine in 1922.

Head coaching record

Football

References

1896 births
1969 deaths
Ole Miss Rebels football players
Southern Miss Golden Eagles football players
Southern Miss Golden Eagles football coaches
Southern Miss Golden Eagles basketball coaches
University of Mississippi Medical Center alumni